Frank Warren White (March 17, 1880 – March 14, 1947) was an American football coach and professor of physical education.  He was the fifth head football coach at Temple University in Philadelphia, Pennsylvania, serving for one season, in 1908, and compiling a record of 3–2–1. In 1909, he was appointed as assistant professor of physical education at Lehigh University.

White practiced medicine in Rockwood, Pennsylvania from 1924 to 1942 and then in Jenners, Pennsylvania until he was incapacitated, breaking his hip in a fall on February 1, 1946. He died suddenly, on March 14, 1947, at his home in Rockwood.

Head coaching record

References

External links
 

1880 births
1947 deaths
20th-century American physicians
Lehigh University faculty
Temple Owls football coaches
Tufts University alumni
People from Arlington, Massachusetts
Physicians from Pennsylvania
Sportspeople from Middlesex County, Massachusetts